Kirk DeVere Corbin (born 12 March 1955 in Barbados) is a Barbadian former professional footballer who played in the Football League, as a right back.

Sources

1955 births
Living people
Barbadian footballers
Association football wingers
Cambridge United F.C. players
Wycombe Wanderers F.C. players
English Football League players